Yan Bolagh (also Romanized as Yān Bolāgh; also known as Takhteh Sūzak) is a village in Takmaran Rural District, Sarhad District, Shirvan County, North Khorasan Province, Iran. At the 2006 census, its population was 88, in 19 families.

References 

Populated places in Shirvan County